Events in the year 1948 in Spain.

Incumbents
Caudillo: Francisco Franco

Births
 January 2 - Cristina García-Orcoyen Tormo, politician.
 February 26 - Miguel Ángel Cascallana, handball player (d. 2015)
 March 5 - Paquirri, bullfighter (d. 1984)
 March 16 - Picanyol, comic artist.(d. 2021)  
 March 29 - Daniel Astrain, footballer

Deaths

 January 7  – Maria de Maeztu Whitney, Spanish educator, feminist (b. 1882)
 May 18 – Francisco Alonso, Spanish composer (b. 1887)

See also
List of Spanish films of the 1940s

References

 
Years of the 20th century in Spain
1940s in Spain
Spain
Spain